Raheem Tunji Olawuyi (commonly called Ajuloopin) is a Nigerian politician. He is a member of the Federal House of Representatives of Nigeria representing Ekiti/Irepodun/Isin/and Oke-Ero federal constituency of Kwara State.

He is the House Committee Chairman on Emergency and Disaster Preparedness.

Political career 
In 2018, the Ekiti/Irepodun/Isin/Oke-Ero Federal Constituency Bye-Election, contested across the four councils in Kwara, was declared in November as having been won by Raheem Olawuyi.

References 

Nigerian politicians
Living people
Year of birth missing (living people)